Timothy Hodge (born April 2, 1963) is an American voice actor, story artist, writer, animator, comedian, and director at Big Idea Entertainment in Nashville, Tennessee, where he has works on the VeggieTales videos as well as other animated projects like 3-2-1 Penguins!.

Hodge became interested in film-making while he was in 7th grade when he stumbled upon his dad's 8 mm camera and spent his summer making short films using clay and other materials. Hodge later went on to attend Oral Roberts University in Tulsa, Oklahoma. He got his first job in animation at the then-current/now-defunct Willming-Reams Animation studio in San Antonio, Texas, where he drew animated television commercials for seven years, at the same time studying at the San Antonio Art Institute. Early on in life, he graduated from high school in 1981.

He later joined the Walt Disney Feature Animation studio located at the Disney/MGM Studios theme park in Orlando, Florida. While at Disney, he also worked as story artist on films like Mulan, John Henry for Disney's American Legends video and Brother Bear.

It was in 2000 that he took his family and moved north to Chicago, Illinois to join the studios of Big Idea Productions at the Yorktown Center mall and started working in computer animation. Hodge's directorial debut at Big Idea, Lyle the Kindly Viking, won the Best Direct To Video Animated Release at the 2001 World Animation Celebration. He was nominated for an Annie Award for Best Vocal Performance in 2003 for his role as Khalil in Jonah: A VeggieTales Movie.

Hodge won 1st Runner-up for his live-action short film Soccer Mom Detective in 2008.

He currently resides in Franklin, Tennessee.

Filmography
 VeggieTales in the House and VeggieTales in the City (director)
 Time & Chance (director, producer, writer, editor)
 The Pirates Who Don't Do Anything (lead storyboard artist, voice of Jolly Joe)
 3-2-1 Penguins! (director, executive producer, concept artist)
 Soccer Mom Detective (director, producer, writer)
 Brother Bear (additional story)
 Jonah: A VeggieTales Movie (head of story, voice of Khalil), Nominated - Annie Award for Voice Acting in a Feature Production
 VeggieTales (director, producer, writer, storyboard artist, additional voices)
 John Henry (story supervisor, voice of MacTavish)
 Mulan (story)
 Pocahontas (animation assistants)
 Circle of Life: An Environmental Fable (animator)
 The Lion King (breakdown animator: Young Simba)
 Trail Mix-Up (in between artist)

References

External links
 Official website
 

American animated film directors
American animated film producers
1963 births
Living people
People from Boaz, Alabama
University of Montevallo alumni
Luther College (Iowa) alumni
American male composers
21st-century American composers
American male voice actors
American photographers
American male comedians
21st-century American comedians
American storyboard artists
American male screenwriters
American television writers
American male television writers
American film editors
American television directors
Film directors from Iowa
Film directors from Alabama
Screenwriters from Iowa
Screenwriters from Alabama
Walt Disney Animation Studios people
Film producers from Iowa
21st-century American male musicians
Animators from Alabama
Television producers from Alabama